The Nagawali Express or Nagavali Express is a train belonging to the East Coast Railway. It runs between Sambalpur and Nanded as a bi-weekly express train. The train first ran between Sambalpur and Nizamabad on 23 March 2003. The train was later extended from Nizamabad to Hazur Sahib Nanded. The frequency was increased from bi-weekly to tri-weekly in the 2013 rail budget. It was named after the Nagavali River.

Service
It serves the states of Odisha, Andhra Pradesh, Telangana and Maharashtra. It has 19 halts on its way. It starts from Sambalpur on Sunday, Monday and Friday at 08:50 and reaches  on Monday, Tuesday and Saturday at 14:35. The train from Sambalpur to Nanded is numbered as 18309 and from Nanded to Sambalpur as 18310.

Locomotives

Time table
18309- Sambalpur to  

18310- Hazur Sahib Nanded to Sambalpur

Gallery

References

Rail transport in Andhra Pradesh
Rail transport in Odisha
 Express
Named passenger trains of India
Rail transport in Maharashtra
Rail transport in Telangana
Transport in Nanded
Transport in Sambalpur
Express trains in India